Testimony is the only studio album by singer/songwriter Dana Glover.

Released in October 2002, the album reached No. 43 on the UK Albums Chart and produced two singles which both cracked the top 30 on ranking charts. "Thinking Over" reached No. 17 on the Billboard Adult Contemporary chart and No. 22 on the Billboard Adult Top 40 chart, and "Rain" reached No. 30 on the Adult Top 40 chart.

In 2004, "Thinking Over" was used in the Garry Marshall film Raising Helen. Other songs on the album which were used in major films are "The Way (Radio Song)" from the Sandra Bullock/Hugh Grant comedy Two Weeks Notice and "Maybe" from Laws of Attraction.

Track listing

2002 debut albums
Dana Glover albums
Albums produced by Matthew Wilder
DreamWorks Records albums